Future This is the second studio album by English electronic rock duo The Big Pink, released on 11 January 2012 by 4AD. The album was preceded by the release of lead single "Stay Gold" on 14 November 2011.

Track listing

Sample credits
 "Hit the Ground (Superman)" features samples from "O Superman" by Laurie Anderson.
 "Give It Up" incorporates elements of and features samples from "I'm Gonna Tear Your Playhouse Down" by Ann Peebles.
 "Lose Your Mind" contains elements of "Happy House" by Siouxsie and the Banshees.

Personnel
Credits adapted from the liner notes of Future This.

The Big Pink
 Milo Cordell
 Robbie Furze
 Victoria Smith – drums 
 Zan Lyons – additional viola, programming

Additional musicians
 Sally Herbert – additional strings arrangement, violin 
 Ian Burdge – cello 
 Chris Prendergast – drums

Technical
 Paul Epworth – production
 Mark Rankin – engineering
 Joe Hartwell Jones – engineering assistance
 Alan Moulder – mixing
 John Catlin – mixing assistance
 Jimmy Robertson – additional vocals recording 
 Tom Morris – additional drums recording

Artwork
 Tom Beard – band photograph
 David Emery – booklet photography
 Alison Fielding – design

Charts

Release history

Notes

References

2012 albums
4AD albums
Albums produced by Paul Epworth
The Big Pink albums